During the 1991–92 English football season, Swindon Town F.C. competed in the Football League Second Division.

Season summary
In the 1991–92 season, Hoddle's first full season in charge saw a complete change in fortune where in November Swindon were at the top of the table. Unfortunately though, a run of two defeats and then six draws on the bounce saw Swindon slip out of the play-off places, and though they made their way back up the table, four defeats in early March put them just off the pace. Blackburn then attempted to put a huge dent in Swindon's promotion push - making an offer of £800,000 for 32-goal Shearer - and it was an offer that cash-strapped Swindon couldn't afford to refuse. Shearer left, and Swindon managed just seven goals in the nine games following his departure, finishing in eighth place.

Final league table

Results
Swindon Town's score comes first

Legend

Football League Second Division

FA Cup

League Cup

Full Members Cup

Squad

References

Swindon Town F.C. seasons
Swindon Town